Yeshiva University High School may refer to:
 Marsha Stern Talmudical Academy (Yeshiva University High School for Boys)
 Yeshiva University High School for Girls
 Yeshiva University High School of Los Angeles